This is a list of artists who have competed on the American reality television competition show, The Voice. In its eleven years running, twenty-two artists have been granted the title of "The Voice" – Javier Colon, Jermaine Paul, Cassadee Pope, Danielle Bradbery, Tessanne Chin, Josh Kaufman, Craig Wayne Boyd,  Sawyer Fredericks, Jordan Smith, Alisan Porter, Sundance Head, Chris Blue, Chloe Kohanski, Brynn Cartelli, Chevel Shepherd, Maelyn Jarmon, Jake Hoot, Todd Tilghman, Carter Rubin, Cam Anthony, Girl Named Tom, & Bryce Leatherwood respectively. There were 32 contestants in the first season, 40 in seasons eighteen through twenty, 48 in seasons two, four through seventeen, and twenty-one, 56 in season twenty-two, and 64 in season three.

Artists

Notes
 A Originally from Adam Levine's team.
 A2 Briefly from Adam Levine's team.
 B Originally from Blake Shelton's team.
 B2 Briefly from Blake Shelton's team.
 C Originally from CeeLo Green's team.
 C2 Briefly from CeeLo Green's team.
 D Originally from Christina Aguilera's team.
 D2 Briefly from Christina Aguilera's team.
 E Originally from Shakira's team.
 F Originally from Usher's team.
 G Originally from Pharrell Williams's team.
 G2 Briefly from Pharrell Williams's team.
 H Originally from Gwen Stefani's team.
 H2 Briefly from Gwen Stefani's team.
 I Was originally eliminated in Battles Rounds but received the Coach Comeback.
 I2 Was originally eliminated in Knockout Rounds but received the Coach Comeback.
 J  Originally from Miley Cyrus's team.
 J2  Briefly from Miley Cyrus's team.
 K  Originally from Alicia Keys's team.
 K2  Briefly from Alicia Keys's team.
 L  Originally from Kelly Clarkson's team.
 L2  Briefly from Kelly Clarkson's team.
 M  Originally from Jennifer Hudson's team.
 M2  Briefly from Jennifer Hudson's team.
 N  Lost the Knockout Rounds and was saved by his/her coach.
 N2  Lost the Live Cross Battles and was saved by his/her coach.
 N3  Lost the Battle Rounds and was saved by his/her coach.
 N4  Lost the Battle Rounds but was given the Playoff Pass by his/her coach.
 O   Won the artist comeback and joined another coach team.
 O2   Won the artist comeback and remained in the team.
 P  Originally from John Legend's team.
 P2  Briefly from John Legend's team.
 Q Was originally eliminated in Battles Rounds but was brought back to the Comeback Stage.
 Q2 Was originally eliminated in Live Cross Battles but was brought back to the Comeback Stage.
 R   Won the Wild Card Round and remained in the team.
 S Originally from Nick Jonas's team.
 S2 Briefly from Nick Jonas's team.
 T Originally from Ariana Grande's team.
 T2 Briefly from Ariana Grande's team.
 U Originally from Camila Cabello's team.
 U2 Briefly from Camila Cabello's team.
 V Returned after failing to get a chair turn in Season 2.
 V2 Returned after failing to get a chair turn in Season 3.
 V3 Returned after failing to get a chair turn in Season 4.
 V4 Returned after failing to get a chair turn in Season 5.
 V5 Returned after failing to get a chair turn in Season 6.
 V6 Returned after failing to get a chair turn in Season 8.
 V7 Returned after failing to get a chair turn in Season 9.
 V8 Returned after failing to get a chair turn in Season 10.
 V9 Returned after failing to get a chair turn in Season 11.
 V10 Returned after failing to get a chair turn in Season 12.
 V11 Returned after failing to get a chair turn in Season 14.
 V12 Returned after failing to get a chair turn in Season 15.
 V13 Returned after failing to get a chair turn in Season 19.
 V14 Returned after failing to get a chair turn in Season 22.
 W Originally from Niall Horan's team.
 W2 Briefly from Niall Horan's team.
 X Originally from Chance the Rapper's team.
 X2 Briefly from Chance the Rapper's team.

References

The Voice (American TV series)
 
Voice (American TV series) contestants, The